Sun Mengying (born 11 April 1990) is a Chinese handball player for Shanghai and the Chinese national team.

She competed at the 2015 World Women's Handball Championship in Denmark.

References

1990 births
Living people
Chinese female handball players
Asian Games medalists in handball
Handball players at the 2010 Asian Games
Asian Games gold medalists for China
Medalists at the 2010 Asian Games